The PowerNode 9080 was a dual processor 32-bit Superminicomputer produced by Fort Lauderdale, Florida based electronics company Gould Electronics in the 1980s.  Its UTX/32 4.3BSD Berkeley Unix-based operating system was one of the first multi-processor shared memory implementations of Unix, although the processors operated in a Master-Slave configuration with a Mutual Exclusion (MutEx) lock on all manipulations on Kernel tables.  The second processor, called IPU, left all I/O operations to the main CPU. Machines could be configured for either single or dual processor operation.

The machine itself was housed in a number of 19 inch rack cabinets and the main CPUs consisted of 18 boards of ECL logic.  The resulting system was capable of benchmark performances up to 20 MIPS, a very high rating at the time.  The PowerNode systems were a very close relative of Gould Concept-32 real time computer systems running their proprietary MPX real time operating system.  Only about two boards differed between the Unix-running PowerNode machines and the MPX-running real time machines.  The most significant of these was the Memory Management board which had virtual memory mapping abilities in the Unix-variant but not in the real-time variant.

A smaller model of the PowerNode was also available in the form of the Gould PowerNode 6032 and 6040 single processor systems and 6080 dual CPU which achieved a 7 MIPS performance similar to the contemporary DEC VAX-11/780 and VAX-11/785.

The PowerNode series was replaced by the Gould NP-1 series.  When Gould was purchased by Nippon Mining, the computer division was divested on the instructions of the US Government for National Security concerns and became part of Encore Computer.

References

Minicomputers